Malin Orachev (born 3 December 1972) is a former Bulgarian footballer.

Career
Orachev started his career in his home town of Blagoevgrad, playing for one of the oldest teams in Bulgaria, Pirin. In June 1995, he signed with Naftex from the town of Burgas. In the following 9 years Malin played for Naftex 226 times and scored 11 goals.

Coaching career
Orachev worked as a head coach of Pomorie for several years until his resignation in September 2017.

References

External links
 Guardian's Stats Centre
 

1972 births
Living people
People from Blagoevgrad Province
Bulgarian footballers
Bulgaria international footballers
Bulgarian football managers
First Professional Football League (Bulgaria) players
Second Professional Football League (Bulgaria) players
OFC Pirin Blagoevgrad players
Neftochimic Burgas players
FC Lokomotiv 1929 Sofia players
FC Pomorie players
Association football midfielders
Sportspeople from Blagoevgrad Province
20th-century Bulgarian people
21st-century Bulgarian people